Srednji Grahovljani is a village in Pakrac, Croatia. It is located on the northeast of Pakrac, south of the Papuk mountain in western Slavonia. It is administratively part of the city of Pakrac and did not have residents. (census 2011).

References

Ghost towns in Croatia